Milton Hopkins, Jr. (1906–1983) was a professor of biology and an editor of college textbooks.

Biography 
In 1917 Milton Hopkins, Jr. moved with his family to Port Washington, New York and attended elementary school and high school there. In 1930 he received his bachelor's degree from Amherst College. After graduating with M.A. and Ph.D. in biology from Harvard University, he was a professor of biology from 1936 to 1945 at the University of Oklahoma. In 1944 he married Elizabeth Robbins Hewlett. In 1945 they returned to the Port Washington area to live in the Hewlett homestead (located in the Village of Flower Hill), which was built in the early 1700s and occupied by eight generations of the Hewlett family before being sold to the real estate developer Ivo Matkovic. From 1945 until retirement, Milton Hopkins was editor-in-chief of college textbooks at Holt, Rinehart & Winston. He was a local historian of Long Island and president of the Cow Neck Peninsula Historical Society of Port Washington. Milton and Elizabeth Hopkins lived in the historic Hewlett house until 1980. Upon his death he was survived by his widow, a daughter, and two granddaughters.

Legacy 
A small green space on East Gate Road in Flower Hill is named Milton Hopkins Green in honor of Hopkins.

Selected publications

References

1906 births
1983 deaths
Flower Hill, New York
20th-century American botanists
Amherst College alumni
Harvard Graduate School of Arts and Sciences alumni
University of Oklahoma faculty